The yellowtail mullet (Minimugil cascasia) is a species of potamodromous ray-finned fish, a mullet belonging to the family Mugilidae. It is the only species in the genus Minimugil. It is found in Pakistan, India and Bangladesh.

References

Mugilidae
Fish described in 1822